Evening Star is a vector graphics train simulation game for the ZX Spectrum, Commodore 64, BBC Micro, Acorn Electron, and Amstrad CPC published by Hewson Consultants in 1987. It is the sequel to Southern Belle.

Gameplay
The idea of the game is to successfully get the "Evening Star" from Bath to its destination Bournemouth on the old Somerset and Dorset line. The objectives are keeping to the tight timetable, earning points for safety and economy, and obeying signals. Stops are made at stations along the route to pick up passengers.

External links 

1987 video games
Amstrad CPC games
BBC Micro and Acorn Electron games
Commodore 64 games
Hewson Consultants games
Single-player video games
Train simulation video games
Video games developed in the United Kingdom
ZX Spectrum games